The  Gustav Landauer Library Witten (GLBW) is a special library in Witten, Germany.

History 

The Gustav Landauer Library was founded 2011 in sociocultural center Trotz Allem (Despite of it all) inside of the then infoshop. The name relates to the theorist of anarchism Gustav Landauer. Foundation of the collection was a big book donation on occasion of the 100th anniversary of the death of the Russian writer and anarcho-pacifist Leo Tolstoy in 2010. Further book donations followed. In 2012 Trotz Allem together with Deutsch-Israelische Gesellschaft Witten (German-Israeli Society Witten) organized a lecture by the editor of Ausgewählte Schriften (elected writings) of Landauer, Siegbert Wolf, about philosophy and judaism at Gustav Landauer. In the context of this event a book exposition by Gustav Landauer Library about the life and work of Gustav Landauer was presented.

Scope of collection 

The collection of Gustav Landauer Library is focused at publications, that were distributed, read and discussed in the left-wing-alternative movements. Among other subjects it includes the topics antifascism, gender, free pedagogy, peace politics, ecology, economy, political developments in the diverse countries of the world and the teachings of classic and current theorists.

External links

References 

Witten
Witten
Anarchist organisations in Germany
2011 establishments in Germany
Libraries established in 2011